The Miami Edison Middle School (also known as the Dade County Agricultural High School or Miami Edison Senior High School, and not to be confused with Miami Edison High School) is a historic school in Miami, Florida. It is located at 6101 Northwest 2nd Avenue. On June 5, 1986, it was added to the U.S. National Register of Historic Places. Edison closed in 2015 to make way for New iTech @ Thomas A. Edison Educational Center.

References

External links

 Dade County listings at National Register of Historic Places
 Florida's Office of Cultural and Historical Programs
 Dade County listings
 Miami Edison Middle School

Buildings and structures in Miami
History of Miami
Schools in Miami
National Register of Historic Places in Miami
Miami-Dade County Public Schools